Sir Henry Pierrepont (1546 – 19 March 1615) was an English MP who resided at Holme Pierrepont, Nottinghamshire.

Family
He was the son of Sir George Pierrepont and succeeded him in 1564. His mother, Winnifred née Twaits, remarried Sir Gervase Clifton.
He married Frances Cavendish, daughter of the Rt. Hon. Sir William Cavendish and Elizabeth Hardwick.

The children were:
Grace Pierrepont
Robert Pierrepont, 1st Earl of Kingston-upon-Hull
Elizabeth Pierrepont, who was brought up in the household of Mary, Queen of Scots, and later married Thomas Erskine, 1st Earl of Kellie

Life

He was elected as Member of Parliament for Nottinghamshire in 1572, and then took up a series of local appointments, becoming a Justice of the Peace around 1573, High Sheriff of Nottinghamshire in 1575–76 and 1601–02, and Recorder of Nottingham in 1603. He was knighted in April 1603.

Memorial
His memorial is in St. Edmund's Church, Holme Pierrepont.

References

Sources
The Complete Peerage of England, Scotland, Ireland, Great Britain and the United Kingdom, volume XI.

1546 births
1615 deaths
17th-century English people
High Sheriffs of Nottinghamshire
Knights Bachelor
Politicians awarded knighthoods
English MPs 1572–1583
Henry